Sam Yahya Al-Ahmar is a Yemeni politician. He quit his position as Deputy Minister of Culture over the 2011 Yemeni uprising.

References

Yemeni politicians
Living people
General People's Congress (Yemen) politicians
Year of birth missing (living people)
Place of birth missing (living people)

People from Amran Governorate